The 1913–14 season was Chelsea Football Club's ninth competitive season. The club finished 8th in the First Division, their highest league placing to that point.

Table

References

External links
 1913–14 season at stamford-bridge.com

1913–14
English football clubs 1913–14 season